Kiss the Sky is the only studio album by American singer and actress Tatyana Ali. The album was released on August 25, 1998, peaking at number 106 on the Billboard 200 and number 47 on Billboard'''s Top R&B/Hip-Hop Albums chart. The album produced the top ten Billboard Hot 100 hit "Daydreamin'", as well as the UK hit single "Boy You Knock Me Out", and the ballad "Everytime". The album did not sell as well as expected, and as such, Ali was dropped from the label in late 1999. The album was made with the help of her Fresh Prince'' co-star and rapper Will Smith.

Track listing

Production and personnel
Track 2 Arranged and produced by StoneBridge (for StoneBridge Productions & Big Management Ltd.) & Kelly Price (for Priceless Music).  Recorded by StoneBridge & Michael Blum.  Mixed by Rob Chiarelli for Final Mix.  All Programming by Rob Chiarelli.  
Track 3 Produced by Vincent Herbert, Rob Fusari & Mary Brown.  Recorded by Commissioner Gordon; assisted by Tim Lauber & Jan Fairchild.  Mixed by Tony Maserati.  Eric Jackson: Guitars
Track 4 Produced by Joe Priolo & A. Cantrall for Signature Productions.  Recorded by John "Sticky Fingers" Smeltz.  Mixed by Rob Chiarelli.  Randy Bowland: Guitars.  All other instruments and programming by Joe Priolo.  Strings by The Larry Gold Players; arranged & conducted by Larry Gold.
Track 5 Arranged, produced and recorded by Rodney Jerkins & LaShawn Daniels.  Mixed by Dexter Simmons.  All Music Performed by Rodney Jerkins.
Track 6 Arranged and produced by Narada Michael Walden. Engineered by Marc Reyburn, Jimi Fischer & David Frazer.  Mixed by David Frazer.  Jimi Fischer, Rob Chiarelli: All Keyboards & Programming.  Angela Bofill, Tina Gibson, Nikita Germaine & Sandy Griffith: Vocal Backing 
Track 8 Arranged by Tia Minze & Keith Pelzer.  Produced by Keith Pelzer.  Recorded by Keith Pelzer & Serban Ghenea.  Mixed by Dexter Simmons.
Tracks 9 & 12 Arranged, produced and performed by Shawn Stockman.  Recorded by James Hinger & Rob Chiarelli.  Mixed by Shawn Stockman & James Hinger.
Track 10 Arranged and produced by Marti Sharron & Danny Sembello.  Recorded by Jon Ingoldsby, Thom Russo & Martin Horenburg.  Mixed by Dave Way.  Jubu: Guitars.  Sheree Ford-Payne: Vocal Backing
Track 11 Arranged and produced By Kelly Price & Fred Jerkins III.  Recorded by John Smeltz & Ben Garrison.  Mixed by Fred Jerkins III & Dexter Simmons.  Strings (The Darkchild Orchestra) arranged by Larry Gold & Fred Jerkins III.  Chico DeBarge: Co-lead vocal.  Kelly Price: Vocal Backing.

Singles chart positions

References

External links
 Production & Personnel at Discogs

1998 debut albums
Tatyana Ali albums
Albums produced by Narada Michael Walden
Albums produced by Rodney Jerkins
Work Records albums